Igor Perović (Cyrillic: Игор Перовић; born 3 March 1974) is a Serbian former basketball player.

Professional career
While playing for Partizan, Perović won the 1992 Euroleague.

References

1974 births
Living people
Basketball players from Belgrade
KK Beopetrol/Atlas Beograd players
KK Partizan players
KK Crvena zvezda players
KK Budućnost players
KK Lavovi 063 players
BKK Radnički players
Shooting guards
Serbian expatriate basketball people in Germany
Serbian expatriate basketball people in France
Serbian expatriate basketball people in Israel
Serbian expatriate basketball people in Montenegro
S.Oliver Würzburg players
Serbian men's basketball players
Serbian men's basketball coaches
Yugoslav men's basketball players